Gerald Lyndley Cogger (born 7 September 1933) is a former English cricketer.  Cogger was a right-handed batsman who bowled right-arm medium-fast. He was born at Uckfield, East Sussex.

Cogger made his first-class debut for Sussex against Oxford University in 1954.  He made seven further first-class appearances for the county, all of which came in the 1957 season, and the last of which came against Somerset.  In his eight first-class appearances, Cogger took 7 wickets at an average of 40.85, with a high best figures of 3/20.  A tailender, he scored just 12 runs at a batting average of 1.71, with a high score of 5.

His nephew, Kevin Smith, also played first-class cricket.

References

External links

1933 births
Living people
People from Uckfield
English cricketers
Sussex cricketers